In Your Eyes is the first solo EP released by singer-songwriter Gary Hughes from melodic hard rock band Ten. Gary Hughes' third solo album Precious Ones, is the album from which the EP is derived from. The compact disc was officially released only in Asian markets.

Track listing
All songs written and arranged by Gary Hughes.
 "In Your Eyes" (EP Version) – 5:30
 "The Miracle Is You" (For EP Only) – 6:34
 "Be My Fantasy Tonight" (For EP Only) – 6:09
 "All Fall Down" (For EP Only) – 2:50
 "In Your Eyes" (Karaoke version) – 5:30

All tracks were previously unreleased.
Track 1, original version on the album Precious Ones.

Personnel
Gary Hughes – vocals, guitars, keyboards and Bass guitars
Vinny Burns – guitars
Greg Morgan – drums
Andy Thompson – keyboards
Ralph Santolla – guitars
Aziz Ibrahim – guitars
Jason Thanos – backing vocals
Todd Plant – backing vocals
Mark Ashton – backing vocals
Ray Brophy – backing vocals

Production
Producer – Gary Hughes
Mixing – Ray Brophy
Engineering – Ray Brophy
Additional Engineering – Neil Amison (Startrack) and Tim (Gracieland)
Mastered – John Blamire

References 

Gary Hughes albums
1998 EPs